Hefei Economic and Technological Development Zone is an economic and technical development zone (ETZ) in Hefei, capital of east China's Anhui province. It was created on April 3, 1993. On February 13, 2000, it was approved to an ETZ at national level. It is located close to Hefei Xinqiao International Airport.

References

External links
 

Hefei
Economy of Anhui
1993 establishments in China
Special Economic Zones of China